Sir David Victor Kelly  (14 September 1891 – 27 March 1959) was a British diplomat who was Minister to Switzerland and Ambassador to Argentina, Turkey, and the Soviet Union.

Education
Kelly was educated at St Paul's School, London, and Magdalen College, Oxford, where he was a demy (scholar) and gained a first class degree in modern history in 1913.

Career
Kelly passed the entrance examination for the Foreign Office in 1914 but on the outbreak of the First World War he volunteered for the army and was commissioned in the Leicestershire Regiment. He was brigade intelligence officer for the 110th Infantry Brigade (formed from Leicestershire Regiment battalions and known as the Leicester Tigers) from 1915. He was awarded the Military Cross in 1917.

After the war Kelly joined the Diplomatic Service and served in Buenos Aires, Lisbon, Mexico, Brussels, Stockholm and Cairo. He was Minister to Switzerland 1940–42 followed by appointments as Ambassador to Argentina 1942–46, to Turkey 1946–49 and to the Soviet Union 1949–51. He was appointed a Companion of the Order of St Michael and St George (CMG) in the King's Birthday Honours of 1935, promoted to Knight Commander (KCMG) in the Birthday Honours of 1942 on his appointment to Argentina, and to Knight Grand Cross (GCMG) in the New Year Honours of 1950. He was also made a Knight of Malta in 1954.

Family
In 1920, while serving in Buenos Aires, Kelly met and married Isabel Adela Mills. They had a son and a daughter, but she died in 1927. In 1929 he married his second wife, Marie-Noële de Jourda de Vaux, who as Lady Kelly became "a diplomatic hostess, traveler and writer ... one of the grandes dames of British diplomacy ... [who] presided with great panache over embassies in Bern, Buenos Aires and Ankara" As Marie Noele Kelly  she wrote five books including her autobiography, Dawn to Dusk (Hutchinson, London, 1960) with a preface by Rebecca West, a close friend. They had two sons, one being the writer Laurence Kelly, and she survived her husband by 35 years until her death in 1995.

Battle of Britain film
In the 1969 film Battle of Britain, Kelly was played by Ralph Richardson.

Publications
 39 Months with the "Tigers", 1915–1918, Ernest Benn, London, 1930
 The Ruling Few : or, the Human Background to Diplomacy, Hollis & Carter, London, 1952
 Beyond the Iron Curtain, Hollis & Carter, London, 1954
 The Hungry Sheep : a Discussion of Modern Civilisation, Hollis & Carter, London, 1955
 El Poder Detrás del Trono (The Power Behind the Throne), Ediciones Coyoacán, Buenos Aires, 1962

References

Bibliography
 KELLY, Sir David (Victor), Who Was Who, A & C Black, 1920–2008; online edn, Oxford University Press, Dec 2007, accessed 19 July 2012
 Neville Wylie, Kelly, Sir David Victor (1891–1959), Oxford Dictionary of National Biography, Oxford University Press, 2004; online edn, Jan 2008, accessed 19 July 2012
 Sir David Kelly (obituary), The Times, London, 24 February 1995, page 21
 Obituary – An Outspoken Envoy At Moscow – Sir David Kelly, The Glasgow Herald, 28 March 1959, page 6

1891 births
1959 deaths
Alumni of Magdalen College, Oxford
Ambassadors of the United Kingdom to Argentina
Ambassadors of the United Kingdom to Switzerland
Ambassadors of the United Kingdom to Turkey
Ambassadors of the United Kingdom to the Soviet Union
British Army personnel of World War I
Knights Grand Cross of the Order of St Michael and St George
Knights of Malta
People educated at St Paul's School, London
Recipients of the Military Cross
Royal Leicestershire Regiment officers
People of the British Council